The 2001–02 Moldovan Cup was the 11th season of the Moldovan annual football cup competition. The competition ended with the final held on 22 May 2002.

Round of 16
The first legs were played on 10 October 2001. The second legs were played on 24 October 2001.

|}

Quarter-finals
The first legs were played on 22 March 2002. The second legs were played on 3 April 2002.

|}

Semi-finals
The first legs were played on 24 April 2002. The second legs were played on 8 May 2002.

|}

Final

References
 

Moldovan Cup seasons
Moldovan Cup
Moldova